"Bloody Well Right" is a song by English rock band Supertramp from their 1974 album Crime of the Century. It appeared as the B-side of the single "Dreamer" in 1974. Listeners in the United States preferred it to the A-side, and "Bloody Well Right" became their breakthrough hit in the country, peaking at number 35 on the Billboard Hot 100.

Lyrical content 
Davies consciously linked the song to the album's opening track "School" with the line "So you think your schooling is phoney", helping to perpetuate the false impression that Crime of the Century is a concept album. According to Hodgson, any unifying thread beyond that was left to the listener's imagination.  Ultimate Classic Rock critic Nick DeRiso stated "Bloody Well Right" shares the theme with "School" of "questioning the education system."

Structure 
The song begins with Rick Davies playing a Wurlitzer electric piano 51-second piano solo, leading into the rest of the band joining in. There is then a guitar solo played by Roger Hodgson, making use of the wah-wah pedal, leading in the first sung word at the 1:38 mark in the song. The first verse and chorus occur with a short instrumental bridge into the second verse and second, slightly modified, chorus. The rest of the song is different variations of the chorus with a saxophone solo in the background. The song slowly fades away to the sound of the saxophone.

Reception
DeRiso rated it as Supertramp's 2nd best song, praising its "sharp anti-authoritarian streak."  Gary Graff of Billboard also rated it as Supertramp's 2nd best song, calling it "an angry indictment of British economic caste systems couched with hard rock, jazz and Music Hall references."

Live versions 
This song became a staple in Supertramp concerts after its release. The song's length is extended live often reaching over seven minutes. It appears on Paris, Live '88, It Was the Best of Times, and Is Everybody Listening?.

Personnel 
Rick Davies – Wurlitzer electronic piano, acoustic piano, lead and backing vocals
Roger Hodgson – electric and acoustic guitars, backing vocal
Bob Siebenberg – drums, percussion
Dougie Thomson – bass
John Helliwell – saxophone, backing vocal

Charts

References

External links
 

Supertramp songs
1974 songs
Songs written by Rick Davies
Songs written by Roger Hodgson
Song recordings produced by Ken Scott
A&M Records singles